Krasnokutsk is an urban-type settlement in Bohodukhiv Raion, Kharkiv Oblast, Ukraine. It hosts the administration of Krasnokutsk settlement hromada, one of the hromadas of Ukraine. Population: 

Krasnokutsk is located on the right bank of the Merla River, a left tributary of the Vorskla River in the drainage basin of the Dnieper.

History
It was a village in Bogodukhov uyezd of Kharkov Governorate of the Russian Empire. A former monastery is now the site of Krasnokutskyi arboretum.

A local newspaper is published here since 1930. 

During World War II it was under German occupation from October 1941 to August 1943.

In January 1989 the population was 8511 people. In January 2013 the population was 7744 people.

Until 18 July 2020, Krasnokutsk was the administrative center of Krasnokutsk Raion. The raion was abolished in July 2020 as part of the administrative reform of Ukraine, which reduced the number of raions of Kharkiv Oblast to seven. The area of Krasnokutsk Raion was merged into Bohodukhiv Raion.

Economy

Transportation
Krasnokutsk is on a road connecting Bohodukhiv in Kharkiv Oblast with Opishnia in Poltava Oblast, with further access to the West to Poltava and Myrhorod. There are local roads as well.

References

Urban-type settlements in Bohodukhiv Raion
Bohodukhiv Raion
Bogodukhovsky Uyezd